Pablo is a Spanish form of the name Paul.

People
Pablo Alborán, Spanish singer
Pablo Aimar, Argentine footballer
Pablo Armero, Colombian footballer
Pablo Bartholomew, Indian photojournalist
Pablo Brandán, Argentine footballer
Pablo Brenes, Costa Rican footballer
Pablo Alborán, Spanish singer-songwriter
Pablo Casals, Catalan cello virtuoso
Pablo Couñago, Spanish footballer
Pablo Cuevas, Uruguayan tennis player
Pablo Eisenberg (born 1932), American scholar, social justice advocate, and tennis player
Pablo Escobar, Colombian drug lord
Pablo Iglesias Turrión, Spanish politician
Pablo Francisco, Chilean American comedian
Pablo Galdames, Chilean footballer
Pablo P. Garcia, Filipino politician
Pablo Hernández Domínguez, Spanish footballer
Pablo Ibañez, Spanish footballer
Pablo Iglesias Simón, Spanish theatre director, sound designer and playwright
Pablo Lombi, Argentine field hockey player
Pablo Darío López, Argentine footballer
Pablo Iglesias Posse, Spanish Marxist labour leader
Pablo Lopez (disambiguation), several people, includes Pablo López
Pablo Lugo, Puerto Rican boxer
Pablo Manzoni, Italian make-up artist known professionally in the 1960s and 70s as Pablo of Elizabeth Arden
Pablo Meana, Argentine volleyball player
Pablo Medina Velázquez, Paraguayan journalist
Pablo Mills, British footballer
Pablo Miyazawa, Brazilian journalist
Pablo Neruda, Chilean winner of the Nobel Prize for Literature
Pablo Olmedo, Mexican distance runner
Pablo Picasso, Spanish painter, sculptor, and co-founder of cubism
Pablo Prigioni, Argentine National Basketball Association player
Pablo Ramirez (skateboarder), Dominican American skateboarder
Pablo Ramírez, Mexican Spanish-language sportscaster in the United States
Pablo Salinas, Bolivian footballer
Pablo Sandoval, Venezuelan Major League Baseball player
Pablo de Sarasate, Spanish violinist and composer
Pablo Soto (footballer), Chilean footballer
Pablo Soto (software developer), Spanish computer specialist
Pablo Squella, Chilean middle-distance runner
Pablo Visconti, Argentinian professor of reproductive biology
Pablo Zabaleta, Argentinian footballer
Juan Pablo Zurita (known as Juanpa Zurita), Mexican vlogger

Fictional entities
Pablo, from The Adventures of Tintin
 Pablo, a character who first appears in the Dora the Explorer episode, Pablo's Flute and reappears in Dora and Friends: Into the City
Pablo Sanchez, a character from the video game series Backyard Sports
Pablo, a character in Ernest Hemingway's novel For Whom the Bell Tolls (1940)
Pablo, the eponymous character from Cesare Pavese's novel Il Compagno (The Comrade)
Pablo, the protagonist of Pablo's Inferno, an indie comic limited series
Pablo, the penguin from The Backyardigans TV series
Pablo, the penguin from Walt Disney's animated film The Three Caballeros (1945)
Pablo, a character in John Steinbeck's novel Tortilla Flat (1935)
Pablo, an autistic boy and the protagonist from the British children's animated series Pablo
Pablo the Drug Mule Dog, the dog used to smuggle drugs into Britain in an anti-cocaine advertising campaign
Pablo Simon Bolivar, from the TV series Ash vs Evil Dead
Pablo, a fox from Pablo The Little Fox

See also
 Juan Pablo, a common Spanish given name
 Paula (given name), feminine of Pablo
 Paolo (disambiguation)
 Paulo
 Pavel
 Paul (disambiguation)
 Pal (surname)

Spanish masculine given names